No independence before majority rule (abbreviated NIBMAR) was a policy adopted by the United Kingdom requiring the implementation of majority rule in a colony, rather than rule by the white colonial minority, before the empire granted independence to its colonies. It was sometimes reinterpreted as no independence before majority African rule.

Rhodesia and South Africa
In particular, the NIBMAR position was advocated with respect to the future status of Rhodesia as an independent state. British prime minister Harold Wilson was pressured into adopting the approach during a conference in London. Wilson was not initially inclined to do so, fearing it would slow the rate at which Rhodesia could be granted independence, but Lester Pearson, the Prime Minister of Canada, formulated a draft resolution committing Wilson to NIBMAR. Wilson defended the policy when it was attacked as disastrous by opposition Conservatives.
The accomplishment was short-lived, however, as Wilson continued to extend offers to Ian Smith, the Rhodesian Prime Minister, which Smith ultimately rejected. This led Smith's government to declare Rhodesia's independence without British consent and South Africa only Declares independence if South Africa Allowed black South Africans vote in elections. During apartheid only Afrikaaners could vote in any national elections.

References

See also 
 January 1966 Commonwealth Prime Ministers' Conference
 September 1966 Commonwealth Prime Ministers' Conference

British Empire
History of Zimbabwe
Rhodesia
Public policy in the United Kingdom
Harold Wilson
Canada and the Commonwealth of Nations
Rhodesia–United Kingdom relations